Grandview-Hopkins Independent School District is a public school district in Gray County, Texas (USA).

The district has one school that serves students in grades kindergarten through six. Students attend Junior High and High School in either Groom or Pampa.

In 2010, the school district was rated "Exemplary" by the Texas Education Agency.

References

External links
 Grandview-Hopkins ISD - Official site.

School districts in Gray County, Texas